Kopchikovo is a rural locality (a village) in Beryozovskoye Rural Settlement, Beryozovsky District, Perm Krai, Russia. The population was 391 as of 2010. There are 6 streets.

Geography 
Kopchikovo is located on the Shakva River, 7 km northeast of  Beryozovka (the district's administrative centre) by road. Bartym is the nearest rural locality.

References 

Rural localities in Beryozovsky District, Perm Krai